Sarat Bose Road, previously known as Lansdowne Road, is a 3.5 km long stretch of road that connects Southern Avenue (near Rabindra Sarobar Stadium) with AJC Bose Road (at Minto Park) and separates two major localities of Ballygunge and Bhawanipore in South Kolkata, India. South of Southern Avenue crossing, Sarat Bose Road becomes Deboki Kumar Bose Sarani.

Localities
Sarat Bose Road runs north to south almost parallel to Shyama Prasad Mukherjee Road and Gariahat Road. It starts from the Rabindra Sarobar Stadium (Lake Stadium) on the south and moves almost vertically up intersecting other major thoroughfares like Lake Road, Rash Behari Avenue, and Hazra Road just up a few blocks from Ramakrishna Mission Seva Pratishthan, proceeds up north with the famous Lansdowne Market and Padmapukur Square on the left, intersects Chakraberia Road and finally winds it way through Elgin Road, Diocesan High School and ends after meeting AJC Bose Road at Minto Park. It also intersects the smaller arterial roads of Raja Basanta Roy Road, Dr. Sarat Banerjee Road, Manoharpukur Road, Beltala Road, Padmapukur Road, Mahendra Road and Rowland Road. The entire stretch of Sarat Bose Road is a mix of commercial and shopping zones as well as residential zones.

Landmarks

 Lansdowne Towers
 Ishwar Gopal Jew Trust Building
 Central Plaza
 Amar Deep Building
 Lansdowne Court
 Vasundhara Building
 Lansdowne Manor
 Basudhara
 Hindustan Club
 Ideal Plaza
 Great Eastern Technocity
 Diocesan High School
 Rameswara Building
 Hotel Pan Asia Continental
 Laxmi Narayan Temple
 The Samilton Hotel
 Padmapukur Swimming club
 Automobile Association of Eastern India
 Lansdowne Market
 PS Residency
 South Calcutta Girls College
 Ramakrishna Mission Seva Pratishthan
 Deshapriya Park
 Hartley's High School
 National High School
 Rabindra Sarobar Stadium (Lake Stadium)

Restaurants and fast foods

 The Great Booze Story
 OZI
 The French Loaf
 The Sheriff
 Piccadilly Square
 Tangra Kaizen
 The Basement lounge
 Spice Garden
 Pepper Chino
 Cafe Coffee Day
 Khwab
 Tamarind
 Kurry Klub
 Marco Polo
 Barista
 The Wall
 Xrong Place
 Mandarin: 2466 2276
 Aoi
 Zeeshan
 Jai Hind Dhaba
 The Dugout
 The Pirate's Deck
 The Little Donkey
 The Corner Courtyard
 The Tea Trove
 Ice-o-metry
 Nu Variety
 Nepal Sweets
 Annapurna
 Flavours

References

External links
 Map

Roads in Kolkata